Aharoni is a surname. People with this surname include:

 Amikam Aharoni (1929–2002), Israeli physicist
 Israel Aharoni (1882–1946), Jewish zoologist
 Oren Aharoni (born 1973), Israeli basketball coach and former basketball player
 Ron Aharoni (born 1952), Israeli mathematician
 Yisrael Aharoni (born 1953), Israeli chef
 Yohanan Aharoni, né Aronheim (1919–1976), Israeli archaeologist
 Zvi Aharoni, né Arendt (1921-2012), Israeli Mossad agent

Other uses 
 Aharoni (typeface) is a Hebrew typeface family

See also 
 Arnheim (disambiguation)
 Arendt (surname)

Hebrew-language surnames